The Blakeslee Forging Company is a historic industrial complex at 100 West Main Street in the Plantsville area of Southington, Connecticut.  The surviving six buildings, dating to about 1910 or later, were developed for a company founded in 1877 that specialized in drop forging.  The buildings are well preserved structures typifying industrial buildings found in Southington from that era.  The complex was listed on the National Register of Historic Places in 1988.

Description and history
The Blakeslee Forging Company complex is located on the south side of the central village of Plantsville.  It is set well back from the street, behind a municipal parking lot and the former Pultz & Walkley Company industrial complex.  Its largest two buildings form a T, whose top runs parallel to the former railroad right-of-way that now serves as the Farmington Canal Heritage Trail.  The top of the T is a two-story brick building, 20 bays long, with industrial Colonial Revival trim elements, while the leg of the T is a longer single-story brick structure with a gabled roof.  Also facing the railroad right-of-way, north of those buildings, is a single-story six-bay brick building.  Three smaller structures are tucked behind these, between the T and the adjacent buildings to the north.

The Blakeslee Forging Company was founded in 1877 and incorporated in 1896 by Sherman Blakeslee, and first operated in mainly wood-frame buildings built on this site by the Plantsville Manufacturing Company.  The company manufactured parts for carriages, and provided custom drop-forging services.  Most of the buildings in this complex date to 1912-14, when the older buildings were torn down.

See also
National Register of Historic Places listings in Southington, Connecticut

References

Industrial buildings and structures on the National Register of Historic Places in Connecticut
Colonial Revival architecture in Connecticut
Buildings and structures completed in 1912
Buildings and structures in Southington, Connecticut
1912 establishments in Connecticut
National Register of Historic Places in Hartford County, Connecticut
Historic district contributing properties in Connecticut